Aepiblemus is a genus of beetles in the family Carabidae, containing the following species:

 Aepiblemus caeculus Belousov & Kabak, 1993
 Aepiblemus marginalis Belousov & Kabak, 1997

References

Trechinae